Gesiel José de Lima, commonly known as Nasa (born December 8, 1968), is a retired association footballer who played as a midfielder for several Série A clubs.

Career
Born in Olinda, Nasa played for several clubs, such as Santa Cruz, Ferroviário, União São João, Comercial-SP, Moto Club, Madureira and Vasco da Gama. He played 70 Série A games for Vasco and scored one goal. Nasa defended Japanese club Yokohama F. Marinos in 2001 and in 2002. He then returned to Brazil and defended the following clubs: América-PE, Icasa, Guarani de Juazeiro and Madureira, retiring in 2005.

Club statistics

Honors
Ferroviário
Campeonato Cearense: 1994, 1995

Vasco da Gama
Campeonato Carioca: 1998
Torneio Rio-São Paulo :1999
Série A : 1997, 2000
Copa Mercosur: 2000
Copa Libertadores 1998

Yokohama F. Marinos
J1 League: 2002

References

External links

1968 births
Living people
Brazilian footballers
Brazilian expatriate footballers
Sportspeople from Pernambuco
Santa Cruz Futebol Clube players
Ferroviário Atlético Clube (CE) players
União São João Esporte Clube players
Comercial Futebol Clube (Ribeirão Preto) players
Moto Club de São Luís players
Copa Libertadores-winning players
Madureira Esporte Clube players
CR Vasco da Gama players
Yokohama F. Marinos players
J1 League players
Expatriate footballers in Japan
Association football midfielders
América Futebol Clube (PE) players